Shahran is one of the largest tribes in the 'Asir region of Saudi Arabia. Shahrani lands are bordered by Subay' and Al-Shalaowah from the north, 'Abida and Rofaidah from the east, Al Njou’ from the South, and Banou Sha’ba, Mogaidah, Banou Melk, Bal’smar, Banou Sheher, Balgern and Shamran from the west.. The noticed density to the west of Shahrani lands is due to the presence of the large city of Abha in that direction. Through history, tribal wars have been waged between the two neighbors, especially between Shahran and the other major tribe of the area, Qahtan. Such wars are, of course, no longer waged after the formation of the Kingdom of Saudi Arabia. Shahran's largest and main city is Khamis Mushayt (The largest city in ‘Asir, and the 8th largest in Saudi Arabia with an estimated population of 1,100,000). Khamis Mushayt is noted for being the fourth largest trading center in Saudi Arabia, and is famous for its world-class military airbase.

Sharan is a large tribe, thus comes its name (Shahran al-Ar’eda) which means “wide (or volumes) Shahran” in Arabic. The tribe of Shahran has an estimated 950,000 members, and is thus one of the largest in Arabia. The head of Sharan is assigned to the House of Mushayt, and has been such for hundreds of years now.

Origin 

Shahran's origin goes back to Shahran bin Afr’as, a man who belongs to Khath'am bin Anmar. Anmar is believed to be the son of Nizar son of Ma'ad son of Adnan, making them an Adnanite tribe.

Clans 

Shahran branches into the following 27 clans:

Al-Rshaid (آل رشيد )
Koad ( كود )
Nahess  (ناهس)
Al-alGhmer (آل الغمر )
Beni Manbah (بني منبه )
Beni Waheb (بني واهب )
Beni Bejaad (بني بجاد )
Al-Yanfa’ (آل ينفع)
Beni Majoor (بني ماجور )
Beni Slooll (بني سلول)
Beni Samah ( بني سامه )
AlZelal (ال الزلال)
Beni jabruh  (بني جابره)
Al’Hejaj (ال حجاج)
AlGaraeen (القراعين)
Beni Qouhafah (بني قحافه )
Al-Serhan (آل سرحان)
Originally nomadic, immigrated from Najd area, near Riyadh for the sake of living, they are, from bani Hilal who immigrated to North Africa, they are of Semitic descent,  
Beni Rash’hah (بني رشحه)
Al-Remtheen (الرمثين)
Al-alSerh (آل السرح)
Al-Mettair (آل مطير )
Al-alSafq (آل الصفق)
Al-Na’man (آل نعمان)
AlJehrah (الجهرة)
Ahel AlHaqou (أهل الحقو )
Ahel AlSha’af (أهل الشعف)
Beni Malek (بنو مالك)
Al-ojaere  (العجير)

See also
Khamis Mushayt
'Asir
Bisha
Arabs

Tribes of Arabia
Tribes of Saudi Arabia